The American Physical Society honors members with the designation Fellow for having made significant accomplishments to the field of physics.

The following list includes those fellows selected from 1998 through 2010.

1998

 Gregory Scott Adkins
 Blas Rafael Alascio
 Mikhail Alexeevich Anisimov
 Howard Arthur Baer
 Razl Antonio Baragiola
 Klaus Richard Bartschat
 Nicolay G. Basov
 J. Georg Bednorz
 Michael J. Bedzyk
 Charles Henry Bennett
 Beverly K. Berger
 Claude Bernard
 Peter Simon Bernard
 Martin Berz
 Jeffrey Bokor
 J. Richard Bond
 Roderick William Boswell
 Ivan Bozovic
 Hans Albert Braun
 Warren Wesley Buck
 Stephen John Buckman
 Jack O'Neal Burns
 William J. Camp
 Roberto Car
 Joseph Allen Carlson
 Emily Ann Carter
 Lee Wendel Casperson
 Joan Mary Centrella
 James Chen
 R. Sekhar Chivukula
 Marek Cieplak
 Yachin Cohen
 Ralph H. Colby
 Rufus L. Cone
 Stephen Robert Cotanch
 Steven Charles Cowley
 Thomas Lynn Curtright
 James T. Cushing
 Luiz Barroca Da Silva
 Elbio Dagotto
 Werner J. A. Dahm
 Marie-Agnes D. Deleplanque
 Edward Della Torre
 Carleton Edward Detar
 Thomas Gregory Dewey
 Guy Dimonte
 Jacek Dobaczewski
 Ronald W. P. Drever
 Gerardo Giovanni Dutto
 William A. Eaton
 Norman Marvin Edelstein
 Paul John Ellis
 Robin F. C. Farrow
 Philippe M. Fauchet
 James Marshall Feagin
 Peter Mark Felker
 Matthew P. A. Fisher
 George William Foster
 Eduardo Hector Fradkin
 Joseph S. Francisco
 Alejandro Hoeflich Frank
 Gerald Timothy Fraser
 Glenn H. Fredrickson
 Eric Edward Fullerton
 Anthony F. Garito
 Stephen Garoff
 Morteza Gharib
 Walter Gilbert
 Sharon Gail Glendinning
 Steven Harvey Gold
 Vladimir Joseph Goldman
 Alfred T. Goshaw
 Kenneth E. Gray
 Joseph E. Greene
 Arunava Gupta
 Rajendra Gupta
 J. Woods Halley
 Peter C. Hammel
 Herbert Aaron Hauptman
 Mark Douglas Havey
 Dan A. Hays
 Franz Ulrich Hillebrecht
 Gerald Wayne Hoffmann
 Neil C. Holmes
 Rush D. Holt
 John Huth
 Mustapha Ishak Boushaki
 Gerald Peter Jackson
 Juha M. Javanainen
 W. Neil Johnson
 Ieuan Rinallt Jones
 E. Leonard Jossem
 David B. Kaplan
 Richard Lloyd Kautz
 Vasudev Mangesh Kenkre
 Rajinder P. Khosla
 Klaus von Klitzing
 Donald L. Koch
 William John Kossler
 Michael T. Kotschenreuther
 Lawrence M. Krauss
 Jean Peck Krisch
 Arnold H. Kritz
 Sanat K. Kumar
 Anthony Ladd
 Rubin Harold Landau
 Robert Bettes Laughlin
 Francoise K. LeGoues
 Siu Au Lee
 Peter J. Limon
 Bai Xin Liu
 Kopin Liu
 Arthur Eugene Livingston
 Aneesh V. Manohar
 Charles Mathew Mate
 William Henry Matthaeus
 Jabez Jenkins McClelland
 Patrick L. McGaughey
 Charles Meneveau
 Bernard S. Meyerson
 Mario J. Molina
 Robert D. Moser
 George H. Neilson
 Ann E. Nelson
 Andrew Ng
 Gerd Ulrich Nienhaus
 Yoshitsugu Oono
 Paul C. Painter
 Anthony Edward Perry
 John C. Polanyi
 Ronald A. Poling
 Wayne Nicholas Polyzou
 George Edward Possin
 Daryl W. Preston
 Ivan David Proctor
 Talat Shahnaz Rahman
 Karl Ernst Rehm
 John S. Rigden
 Donald S. Rimai
 Thomas Ralph Rizzo
 Robert Alan Robinson
 Harvey A. Rose
 James Benjamin Rosenzweig
 Roy Rubinstein
 Alessandro G. Ruggiero
 Dmitri D. Ryutov
 Kazimierz Rzazewski
 George Anthony Sai-Halasz
 Brian Craig Sales
 Antoine Beno Salin
 James Avery Sauls
 Matthias Scheffler
 John Frederic Schenck
 Arnold J. Schmidt
 David M. Schrader
 Bernard Fredrick Schutz
 Harry Alan Schwettman
 Steven Douglas Scott
 Joseph W. Serene
 Qaisar Shafi
 Benjamin Victor Shanabrook
 Stuart Louis Shapiro
 Bradley Marc Sherrill
 Abner Shimony
 Boris I. Shraiman
 Henry Wayne Sobel
 Paul E. Sokol
 Paul Souder
 Peter Wesley Stephens
 Donald Scott Stewart
 Morris L. Swartz
 Ching W. Tang
 Carlos Tejedor De Paz
 Jon J. Thaler
 Friedrich K. Thielemann
 Valerie Thomas
 Gary George Tibbetts
 Antonio C. Ting
 Sandip Tiwari
 Werner Tornow
 Claudia Megan Urry
 Oriol Tomas Valls
 Valerii M. Vinokur
 Jogindra Mohan Wadehra
 Herbert Walther
 Bennie Franklin Leon Ward
 Margaret Horton Weiler
 Peter Weinberger
 Robert A. Weiss
 Roy N. West
 Carter T. White
 Steven R. White
 Michael C. F. Wiescher
 Kenneth G. Wilson
 Peter Winkler
 Krzysztof Wodkiewicz
 David S. Wollan
 Laurence G. Yaffe
 Guozhen Yang
 Arjun Gaurang Yodh
 John Yoh
 Jian-Min Yuan
 Anton Zeilinger
 Zhenyu Zhang
 William Zimmerman
 Jan Leonard van Hemmen

1999

 Barbara Abraham-Shrauner
 James Paul Alexander
 Ani Aprahamian
 John Patrick Apruzese
 Thomas Banks
 Herbert Bradford Barber
 Norman Charles Bartelt
 Giorgio Bellettini
 Charles L. Bennett
 Thomas James Bernatowicz
 Nora Berrah
 Johann (Gianni) W. Blatter
 John Russell Brandenberger
 Charles A. Brau
 Igor Bray
 Aviva Brecher
 William Howard Breckenridge
 Raymond Brock
 James Stephen Brooks
 Robert William Brown
 Gregory Harger Canavan
 Arthur E. Champagne
 Hudong Chen
 David C. Cheng
 Rob Duncan Coalson
 William Thomas Coffey
 Robert S. Cohen
 Peter John Collings
 James Joseph Collins
 Roy Kent Crawford
 Christopher Deeney
 Charles Dennison Dermer
 David P. DiVincenzo
 Renee Diehl
 Michael C. Downer
 James Henry Duncan
 Michael I. Eides
 Said E. Elghobashi
 Yasuo Endoh
 Jeffrey J. Folkins
 John L. Friedman
 Amnon Fruchtman
 Paul Henry Fuoss
 Peter Louis Galison
 Mary E. Galvin
 Umesh Garg
 Bruce C. Garrett
 Christoph Emanuel Gerber
 Gary Earle Gladding
 Leon Glass
 Alan Herbert Glasser
 Marcelo Gleiser
 Marvin Goldberg
 Alan Ira Goldman
 Jack Terrance Goldman
 Daniel M. Greenberger
 Karl Ontjes Groeneveld
 Donald E. Groom
 Olle R. L. Gunnarsson
 Bruce Alvin Gurney
 Sharon Lee Hagopian
 Michael Hass
 William M. Haynes
 James Richard Heath
 Daniel J. Heinzen
 John William Hepburn
 Eric Herbst
 Alan Van Heuvelen
 Wendell Talbot Hill
 Steven Paul Hirshman
 Tin-Lun Ho
 Ingo Hofmann
 Richard J. Hughes
 Earle R. Hunt
 Gene Emery Ice
 Carlo Jacoboni
 Purusottam Jena
 Mark A. Johnson
 Michael E. Jones
 Hellmut Keiter
 Edward J. Kerschen
 Ernest G. Kessler
 Michael Hannam Key
 Yoshitaka Kimura
 Larry Dale Kirkpatrick
 Vladimir G. Kogan
 Julia A. Kornfield
 Chryssa Kouveliotou
 Sergei I. Krasheninnikov
 Jacqueline Krim
 Andrew H. C. Kung
 Juergen Kurths
 Wai-Kwong Kwok
 Karl Lackner
 Ying-Cheng Lai
 Jean-Pierre Leburton
 Yuan-Pern Lee
 Michael Edward Levi
 Stephen Bernard Libby
 Tony Michael Liss
 Christopher J. Lister
 Chun-Keung Loong
 Ramon E. Lopez
 Sherwin T. Love
 James E. Lukens
 Joseph David Lykken
 Claude M. Lyneis
 Norman David Malmuth
 Alfred Paul Marchetti
 Richard F. Martin
 Michio Matsuzawa
 Michael John Mehl
 Ronald Elbert Mickens
 Albert Migliori
 Michael J. Miksis
 Robert Lynn Miller
 Andrew J. Millis
 Peter A. Mirau
 William Charles Mitchel
 Elisa Molinari
 Alfred Z. Msezane
 Alfred Miller
 Yorikiyo Nagashima
 David Vincent Neuffer
 Riley D. Newman
 Qian Niu
 Eric B. Norman
 Arthur Jack Nozik
 Octavio Jose Obregon
 Benjamin Mark Ocko
 William T. Oosterhuis
 Luis A. Orozco
 Frank James Owens
 Emilio Panarella
 Mark R. Pederson
 Seppo Ilmari Penttila
 Robert James Perry
 Peter M. Pfeifer
 Pierre Pillet
 Valery Pokrovsky
 L. Ramdas Ram-Mohan
 Jorgen Randrup
 J. Thomas Ratchford
 Sidney Redner
 Kennedy J. Reed
 Michael Riordan
 Mark Owen Robbins
 Roger W. Rollins
 Leslie J. Rosenberg
 Michael D. Rosenthal
 Michael Lee Roukes
 David L. Rubin
 John Loren Safko
 Heidi Marie Schellman
 David Paul Schissel
 Wolfgang Peter Schleich
 Mansour Shayegan
 Marc Taylor Sher
 Fujio Shimizu
 Frederick N. Skiff
 Alexander N. Skrinsky
 Milton Dean Slaughter
 Todd I. Smith
 Paul M. Solomon
 Rafael Dolnick Sorkin
 Sumner Grosby Starrfield
 George I. Stegeman
 Daniel L. Stein
 David P. Stern
 Christopher Stubbs
 Sauro Fausto Succi
 Peter Taborek
 Beverley Taylor
 Patricia A. Thiel
 Jan Tobochnik
 Akira Tonomura
 John M. Torkelson
 Hans Peter Trommsdorff
 Yasutomo J. Uemura
 Turgay Uzer
 Priya Vashishta
 Luis Vina
 Harold J. Vinegar
 Arthur B.C. Walker
 Thad Gilbert Walker
 Fred L. Walls
 Zellman Warhaft
 Su-Huai Wei
 Patrick Dan Weidman
 Gary D. Westfall
 Albert Dewell Wheelon
 David H. Whittum
 Donald Ray Wiff
 Robert L. Willett
 Kent R. Wilson
 Robert B. Wiringa
 Colin E. C. Wood
 William Kent Wootters
 Chi Wu
 William B. Yelon
 Kenneth Young
 Linda Young
 Peter Eric Young
 Alexander B. Zamolodchikov
 Dieter Zeppenfeld
 Alex Zettl
 Fu Chun Zhang
 Alex Zunger
 Robert Bruce van Dover

2000

 Richard K. Ahrenkiel
 Spiros H. Anastasiadis
 Dana Zachery Anderson
 Elena Aprile
 Meigan Charlotte Aronson
 Samuel Harry Aronson
 Raymond Dean Astumian
 Gordon J. Aubrecht
 Priscilla S. Auchincloss
 Kim K. Baldridge
 Nitash P. Balsara
 Glenn Bateman
 James Douglas Beason
 Mark Alan Berg
 Rainer Blatt
 Geoffrey Thomas Bodwin
 Bruce Michael Boghosian
 Eric Alan Braaten
 James Edward Brau
 Stanley G. Brown
 Lev Naumovich Bulaevskii
 Allen C. Caldwell
 Robert Craig Cauble
 Michael John Cavagnero
 Francis Edward Cecil
 James Cederberg
 Albert M. Chang
 Yia-Chung Chang
 Sang-Wook Cheong
 Lalit Chandra Chhabildas
 Yanglai Cho
 Kwong Kit Choi
 Michael Coey
 James J. Coleman
 Piers Coleman
 Robert E. Continetti
 Sam R. Coriell
 R. Stephen Craxton
 Nar S. Dalal
 Murray S. Daw
 Carl Richard DeVore
 Stanley Roderick Deans
 Barney L. Doyle
 Jerry Paul Draayer
 Peter David Drummond
 Jerome Lewis Duggan
 Mark Andrew Edwards
 Vitaly Efimov
 Takeshi Egami
 Mostafa A. El-Sayed
 Victor Valentine Eremenko
 Uri Feldman
 Stephen M. Foiles
 Mohamed Gad-el-Hak
 Paul Ginsparg
 Efim Gluskin
 Joseph Grover Gordon
 Mark S. Gordon
 Martin J. Greenwald
 Ulrich Michael Gösele
 David Glen Haase
 James Henry Hammer
 Beverly Karplus Hartline
 David William Hertzog
 James Hough
 Ke-Chiang Hsieh
 Yee Bob Hsiung
 James (Casey) T. Hynes
 Sumio Iijima
 Eric D. Isaacs
 James Allen Isenberg
 Howard E. Jackson
 Ralph Boyd James
 Roderick V. Jensen
 Xiangdong Ji
 Peter Lauson Jolivette
 Robert Rivers Jones
 Bruce David Kay
 John W. Keto
 Murtadha A. Khakoo
 Kay Kinoshita
 Gabriel Kotliar
 Anne Jacob Kox
 Martha Krebs
 Prem Kumar
 Shin-ichi Kurokawa
 Andrew J. Lankford
 Juan C. Lasheras
 James Michael Lattimer
 Michael J. Leitch
 Kevin Thomas Lesko
 Nigel Stuart Lockyer
 David John Lohse
 Daniel Loss
 Philip I. Lubin
 Mark Steven Lundstrom
 Zaida Ann Luthey-Schulten
 Ruprecht Machleidt
 Mohamad Ali Mahdavi
 M. Cristina Marchetti
 Robert Alfred Meger
 Ferenc Mezei
 John Wallace Mintmire
 Jagadeesh Subbaiah Moodera
 Raymond D. Mountain
 Margaret Mary Murname
 Stephen Eric Nagler
 Tai-Kai Ng
 Joseph Nilsen
 Dennis L. Nordstrom
 Mark Alan Novotny
 Gregory Semeon Nusinovich
 Patrick G. O'Shea
 Ann E. Orel
 Burt Ovrut
 Javier Tejada Palacios
 Saul Perlmutter
 Goran Pichler
 Robert D. Pisarski
 David William Piston
 Pedro Antonio Prieto
 Serban Protopopescu
 Dierk Rainer
 Michael Jeffrey Ramsey-Musolf
 Tor O. Raubenheimer
 Linda Elizabeth Reichl
 Stephen P. Reynolds
 Mark Anthony Riley
 Hans Georg Ritter
 Marlene Rosenberg
 Thomas D. Rossing
 Rajarshi Roy
 Wojciech Rozmus
 Michael Rubinstein
 Hiroyuki Sakaki
 Dominique Salin
 James R. Sanford
 Thomas W. L. Sanford
 Otto F. Sankey
 Demetrios G. Sarantites
 Sushil K. Satija
 Sashi Sekhar Satpathy
 Omer Savas
 James Stanford Schilling
 David R. Schultz
 Robert A. Scranton
 Lynn Seaman
 Mordechai Segev
 Eric Stefan G. Shaqfeh
 Junko Shigemitsu
 William A. Sirignano
 Tomasz Skwarnicki
 Darryl Lyle Smith
 Mark L. Spano
 Robert James Spry
 Edmund J. Synakowski
 Krzysztof Szalewicz
 Hideaki Takabe
 Michio Takami
 Maria C. Tamargo
 Michael Alan Tamor
 Stephen Lewis Teitel
 Javier Tejada
 John H. Thomas
 Chin-Sen Ting
 Harry W. K. Tom
 David S. Y. Tong
 Yoji Totsuka
 Gretar Tryggvason
 Jaw-Shen Tsai
 Alexander V. Turbiner
 Raymond Clyde Turner
 William G. Unruh
 John Bos Van Zytveld
 Albert Anthony Viggiano
 Galileo Violini
 Ian A. Walmsley
 Sean Washburn
 Daniel Weihs
 David Hal Weinberg
 James C. Weisshaar
 Dieter Weller
 Gene L. Wells
 Ulrich Welp
 Colm Thomas Whelan
 Kurt Arn Wiesenfeld
 Gwyn Philip Williams
 Alan H. Windle
 Peter Stanley Winokur
 James E. Wiss
 Po-Zen Wong
 David Roy Yarkony
 Arie Zigler
 Michael S. Zisman
 Timothy Scott Zwier
 Robert Raimond de Ruyter van Steven

2001

 Carl Albright
 Yoram Alhassid
 Francois Anderegg
 Igor Samuel Aronson
 Robert S. Averback
 Terry Clayton Awes
 Birger Bo Back
 Rama Bansil
 Ruben Gerardo Barrera
 Pierre Baruch
 Donald R. Beck
 Peter Beiersdorfer
 Elizabeth J. Beise
 Ali Belkacem
 Paul Benioff
 David Nathan Beratan
 Donald Stimson Bethune
 Riccardo Betti
 Robert Bingham
 Ferdinando Borsa
 Robert William Boyd
 Robert H. Brandenberger
 Boris N. Breizman
 Patricia R. Burchat
 Juan Carlos Campuzano
 Paul C. Canfield
 Francesco Cerrina
 Jean-Marc Chomaz
 Thomas David Cohen
 William Boniface Colson
 Mirjam Cvetič
 Jill P. Dahlburg
 Dattatraya Purushottam Dandekar
 Thomas Alan DeGrand
 Rashmi C. Desai
 David A. Dixon
 Charles R. Doering
 John Morrissey Doyle
 Henry van Driel
 Michael Ansel Duncan
 Mark I. Dykman
 Henry Frederick Dylla
 Lester Fuess Eastman
 Lewis S. Edelheit
 Alexander Lev Efros
 Charlotte Elster
 Laurie A. Fathe
 Herbert A. Fertig
 Ephraim Fischbach
 Daniel Mark Fleetwood
 Thomas Harrison Foster
 Alfonso Franciosi
 Hans-Joachim Freund
 James G. Fujimoto
 Richard J. Furnstahl
 Ashok J. Gadgil
 Stephen Geer
 David W. Gidley
 Siegfried H. Glenzer
 Paul Mark Goldbart
 Isaac Goldhirsch
 Mark Goodman
 John A. Goree
 Kim Griest
 J. Raul Grigera
 Lisbeth Dagmar Gronlund
 Philippe Guyot-Sionnest
 Carl Haber
 George C. Hadjipanayis
 Naomi J. Halas
 Robert Haag Heffner
 Paul A Heiney
 Ulrich Walter Heinz
 Karl R Helfrich
 Michael Frederick Herman
 Gary T. Horowitz
 Julia W.P. Hsu
 Bei-Lok Hu
 Mark S. Hybertsen
 Ciriyam Jayaprakash
 Randall David Kamien
 Eli Kapon
 Henry Cornelius Kapteyn
 Anne Myers Kelley
 Alan Robert Kerstein
 Margaret Galland Kivelson
 Teunis Martien Klapwijk
 Edgar Knobloch
 Geoffrey Arthur Krafft
 Serdar Kuyucak
 Paul Gregory Kwiat
 Christine Labaune
 Nghi Quoc Lam
 Andrew E. Lange
 M. Howard Lee
 Timothy Joseph Lee
 Wim Pieter Leemans
 Sanjiva Keshava Lele
 Zachary Howard Levine
 Fred M. Levinton
 Brenton Raymond Lewis
 Amable Linan
 James Michael Lisy
 Byron Gene Lundberg
 Nancy Makri
 John H. Marburger
 Laurence Daniel Marks
 John B. McClelland
 Geoffrey B. McFadden
 Peter Mastin McIntyre
 Laurie Elizabeth McNeil
 Bernhard Alfred Mecking
 Eugene J. Mele
 Jerry Richard Meyer
 John F. Mitchell
 Guenakh Mitselmakher
 Donald Paul Monroe
 David H. Munro
 Margaret Mary Murnane
 George R. Neil
 Herbert Neuberger
 Michael Lester Norman
 Jan Oitmaa
 Angela Villela Olinto
 Monica Olvera de la Cruz
 Christopher J. Palmstrom
 Stephen G. Peggs
 Michael H. Peters
 Philip A. Pincus
 Madappa Prakash
 Ashok Puri
 Krishnan Raghavachari
 Regina Abby Rameika
 Ramamoorthy Ramesh
 Dennis Chaim Rapaport
 Richard A. Register
 John J. Rehr
 Shang-Fen Ren
 Julia Elizabeth Rice
 Hermann Riecke
 Per Arne Rikvold
 Craig Darrian Roberts
 Francis J. Robicheaux
 Natalie Ann Roe
 Frances Mary Ross
 Randal Charles Ruchti
 Subir Sachdev
 Robert J. Scherrer
 Kevin Edward Schmidt
 E. Fred Schubert
 Tamar Seideman
 Abhijit Sen
 Sergei F. Shandarin
 Ramamurti Shankar
 David H. Shoemaker
 Padma Kant Shukla
 Eric B Sirota
 Francis Slakey
 Gregory Scott Smith
 Amarjit Soni
 Masaki Suenaga
 Simon Patrick Swordy
 Xerxes Ramyar Tata
 Antoinette Jane Taylor
 Bruce David Terris
 Peter John Osmond Teubner
 Paul L Tipton
 Erio Tosatti
 John R Tucker
 Philip Michael Tuts
 Boyd William Veal
 John D. Vergados
 Ethan T. Vishniac
 David George Walmsley
 Ronald Lee Walsworth
 Zhen-Gang Wang
 Eicke Weber
 Howard Henry Wieman
 Carl J. Williams
 James Randall Wilson
 Ned S. Wingreen
 Ruqian Wu
 Arun Yethiraj
 Lloyd Martin Young
 Shengbai Zhang
 Bing Zhou
 Paul William Zitzewitz
 Cornelius William de Jager
 Marcellinus P. M. den Nijs
 Karl Albert van Bibber

2002

 Ian Keith Affleck
 Ramesh K. Agarwal
 Steven W. Barwick
 Frank George Baskerville-Bridges
 Douglas H. Beck
 Itzik Ben-Itzhak
 Stephen G. Benka
 Stephen Vincent Benson
 Gennady P. Berman
 Robert William Bilger
 Julie Ann Borchers
 Gerry M. Bunce
 Laurie Jeanne Butler
 Marcela Carena
 Yu-Jiuan Chen
 Mei-Yin Chou
 W. Gilbert Clark
 David C. Clary
 Ronald Elliott Cohen
 Daniel R. Cohn
 Michael E. Coltrin
 Russell J. Composto
 Janet Marie Conrad
 Mark S. Conradi
 Matthew Warren Copel
 Denis Cubaynes
 Ashok Kumar Das
 Paul Brett Davies
 Brett David DePaola
 Paul Timothy Debevec
 J. Thomas Dickinson
 Peter John Doe
 Alan Thomas Dorsey
 Roberto Derat Escudero
 James William Evans
 Adam Frederick Falk
 Steven Robert Federman
 Lee Samuel Finn
 Ralph Bruno Fiorito
 Vladimir E. Fortov
 John T. Fourkas
 Carl Albert Gagliardi
 Richard S. Galik
 Kenneth Franklin Galloway
 Daniel Gammon
 Daniel Joseph Gauthier
 Raymond E. Goldstein
 Rainer Grobe
 James Bernard Grotberg
 Martin Gruebele
 Karl A. Gschneidner
 Gerald M. Hale
 Philip W. Hammer
 P. Gregers Hansen
 Christopher J. Hardy
 Walter Newbold Hardy
 Vincent G. Harris
 Robert James Hastie
 Anna C. Hayes
 Alan Hibbert
 John P. Hill
 David Alan Hoagland
 Brad Lee Holian
 Benjamin S. Hsiao
 John Howard Hubbell
 Robert Hull
 Julian C.R. Hunt
 Atac Imamoglu
 Alan Jackson
 Donald T. Jacobs
 Heinrich Martin Jaeger
 HongWen Jiang
 Sajeev John
 Barbara A. Jones
 Chang Kee Jung
 Harris P. Kagan
 Morton R. Kagan
 Antoine Kahn
 James H. Kaufman
 Stanley Martin Kaye
 Lawrence A. Kennedy
 Donald M. Kerr
 Alexei M. Khokhlov
 Masatoshi Koshiba
 Jeffrey L. Krause
 Andreas S. Kronfeld
 Susan Takacs Krueger
 Mark Howard Kryder
 Gershon Kurizki
 Walter R.L. Lambrecht
 Otto Lamotte Landen
 Barbara F. Lasinski
 Irving A. Lerch
 George N. Lewis
 Shawn-Yu Lin
 Lee A. Lindblom
 Dennis W. Lindle
 Bruce Lipschultz
 Detlef Lohse
 Richard V. E. Lovelace
 Peter B. Lyons
 Efstratios Manousakis
 Sumitendra Mazumdar
 Andrew K. McMahan
 Margaret A. Norris McMahan
 Fulvio Melia
 Robert Louis Merlino
 David Dietrich Meyerhofer
 Peter Daniel Meyers
 Stephen Val Milton
 Nikolai V. Mokhov
 Adriana Moreo
 Robert Alan Morris
 Gilbert Maker Nathanson
 David D. Nolte
 Peter Nordlander
 Franco Nori
 Marjorie Ann Olmstead
 Thomas Michael Orlando
 Louis M. Pecora
 Charles F. Perdrisat
 Hrvoje Petek
 Philip W. Phillips
 Ugo Piomelli
 Fernando A. Ponce
 Itamar Procaccia
 Donald Prosnitz
 Harrison Bertrand Prosper
 Jorge Pullin
 Karin M. Rabe
 Blair Norman Ratcliff
 Bharat Ratra
 Mark Arthur Reed
 Carlos O. Reinhold
 Achim Richter
 Forrest James Rogers
 Erich Sackmann
 Martin John Savage
 Guy Savard
 Rocco Schiavilla
 Gustavo E. Scuseria
 John Dasho Sethian
 Vladimir M. Shalaev
 Ian Peter Joseph Shipsey
 Kenneth R. Shull
 Elizabeth H. Simmons
 Jerry Alvon Simmons
 Kenneth David Singer
 John Edward Sipe
 David John Smith
 Pierre Sokolsky
 Linda Siobhan Sparke
 Boris Z. Spivak
 Peter Christian Stangeby
 Fredrick M. Stein
 Joseph Anthony Stroscio
 Ephraim Suhir
 Brian S. Swartzentruber
 Louis Taillefer
 Carol Elizabeth Tanner
 Cyrus Cooper Taylor
 Thomas Thundat
 Alexei Mikhail Tsvelik
 Leonid Tsybeskov
 Charles Wuching Tu
 Laurette Stephanie Tuckerman
 Jack Tueller
 Alan D. Turnbull
 Tanmay Vachaspati
 John A. Venables
 Leposava Vuskovic
 Xin-Nian Wang
 Thomas Joseph Weiler
 Michael Theodor Alfred Weinert
 Paul Storch Weiss
 Frederick Charles Wellstood
 Xiao-Gang Wen
 K. Birgitta Whaley
 Stanley E. Whitcomb
 Anthony G. Williams
 Forman A. Williams
 Herbert Graves Winful
 Thomas G. Winter
 Gerald Lee Witt
 William John Womersley
 Craig L. Woody
 David C. Wright
 Shin Nan Yang
 Mohana Yethiraj
 Xi-Cheng Zhang
 Robert M. Ziff
 Tomas Diaz de la Rubia

2003

 Chris Edward Adolphsen
 Yefim Aglitskiy
 Ricardo Alarcón
 Richard J. Anderson
 Eva Y. Andrei
 Hartmuth Arenhoevel
 Alexander Vasilievich Balatsky
 Albert-László Barabási
 Ted Barnes
 Wolfgang W. Bauer
 David Peter Belanger
 Daniel ben-Avraham
 Peter A. Bennett
 Herbert J. Bernstein
 Robert M. Biefeld
 Norman Owen Birge
 Reinhold Blumel
 Eberhard Bodenschatz
 John L. Bohn
 Douglas Bonn
 Timothy Howard Boyer
 Aleksander Ignace Braginski
 Thomas E. Browder
 David L. Brower
 Stuart E. Brown
 Wesley R. Burghardt
 Joe Charles Campbell
 John Irvin Castor
 Antonio H. Castro Neto
 Roy William Chantrell
 Matthew William Choptuik
 Demetrios N. Christodoulides
 Shun Lien Chuang
 Andrey V. Chubukov
 Juan Ignacio Cirac
 Andrew G. Cohen
 Stephen Lance Cooper
 Michael Cowperthwaite
 P. Daniel Dapkus
 Mukunda Prasad Das
 N. Anne Davies
 David Spencer DeYoung
 Jean Roger Delayen
 Morton Mace Denn
 Gerald Francis Dionne
 William Ditto
 Scott Dodelson
 Gary Dean Doolen
 Israel Dostrovsky
 John Derek Dowell
 David Alan Drabold
 Rui Rui Du
 Russell D. Dupuis
 Paul J. Emma
 Chang-Beom Eom
 Gregory Lawrence Eyink
 Gerard M. Faeth
 Thomas Lee Ferrell
 Jörg Fink
 Richard Fitzpatrick
 Christopher John Foot
 Stefan Gottfried Frauendorf
 Jean H. Futrell
 Charles Gale
 Giulia Galli
 Shubhra Mukerjee Gangopadhyay
 Laura Justine Garwin
 Ronald Gilman
 Vitaly L. Ginzburg
 James L. Gole
 Allan Griffin
 Leopold Ernst Halpern
 Thomas C. Halsey
 Tao Han
 Francis Harvey Harlow
 Stephen P. Hatchett
 Walter Alexander de Heer
 Chris C. Hegna
 Jack G. Hehn
 Eric A. Hessels
 Robert C. Hilborn
 John C. Hill
 Andrew Hime
 E. John Hinch
 Murray John Holland
 Leo William Hollberg
 Mihaly Horanyi
 Chia-Ren Hu
 Amanda Eileen Hubbard
 Woei-Yann Pauchy Hwang
 Paul Indelicato
 Kenneth Intriligator
 Jacob Nissim Israelachvili
 Chennupati Jagadish
 Samson A. Jenekhe
 Deborah Shiu-Lan Jin
 Sungho Jin
 Duane Douglas Johnson
 Mark Brian Johnson
 Alun Denry Wynn Jones
 Robert Edwin Jones
 Berend Thomas Jonker
 Robert Kaita
 Richard D. Kass
 Efthimios Kaxiras
 Young-Kee Kim
 Paul Marvin Kintner
 Jacob Klein
 Richard I. Klein
 Victor I. Klimov
 Alexei Evgenievich Koshelev
 Robert J. La Haye
 Priscilla W. Laws
 John W. Layman
 Robert J. Lempert
 Hai Qing Lin
 Paul Frederick Linden
 Michael Annan Lisa
 Vladimir N. Litvinenko
 Jia-ming Liu
 Andre Longtin
 William C. Louis
 Anupam Madhukar
 David G. Madland
 Christian Mailhiot
 Fabio Marchesoni
 Anne M. Mayes
 Duncan Eldridge McBride
 Paul L. McEuen
 David Paul McGinnis
 Rodney A. McKee
 Yigal Meir
 Gregory P. Meisner
 Bradley Stewart Meyer
 Stephan S. Meyer
 Scott Thomas Milner
 Partha Pratim Mitra
 Henry Keith Moffatt
 Peter Moller
 Hitoshi Murayama
 Edmund Gregory Myers
 Ron Naaman
 Michael J. Naughton
 Philip C. Nelson
 Vitali Fedorovich Nesterenko
 Jens K. Norskov
 Ismail Cevdet Noyan
 Keith A. Olive
 Rene A. Ong
 Erich Ormand
 Alexander Z. Patashinski
 J. Ritchie Patterson
 Richard D. Petrasso
 Erwin David Poliakoff
 Neil Pomphrey
 Mara Goff Prentiss
 Phillip Nicholas Price
 Leo Radzihovsky
 Lisa Randall
 Helen Louise Reed
 Jack L. Ritchie
 Richard W. Robinett
 Nitin Samarth
 Gary Hilton Sanders
 Peter R. Saulson
 George Albert Sawatzky
 Kenneth Joseph Schafer
 Norbert F. Scherer
 Ilme Schlichting
 Darrell G. Schlom
 Reinhold Hans Schuch
 David Winston Schwenke
 Toshimori Sekine
 Jeffrey H. Shapiro
 Zhi-Xun Shen
 Stephen H. Shenker
 Bruce Arne Sherwood
 John Douglas Simon
 Pekka Kalervo Sinervo
 Surendra P. Singh
 Mano Singham
 Frieda Axelrod Stahl
 Kenneth Graham Standing
 Christopher J. Stanton
 Howard A. Stone
 James B. Strait
 Raman Sundrum
 Kunio Takayanagi
 Kazuo A. Tanaka
 Elias Towe
 Carlos L. Trallero-Giner
 Michael C. Tringides
 Ram K. Tripathi
 Gerrit van der Laan
 Jay Wallace Van Orden
 P. James Viccaro
 Jochen Wambach
 Stephen Michael Wandzura
 Lai-Sheng Wang
 Robert Oliver Watts
 John P. Wefel
 Jie Wei
 Bruce Warren Wessels
 John S. Wettlaufer
 Pavel Wiegmann
 Gary Allen Williams
 Philip Karl Williams
 Charles H. K. Williamson
 Karen Irene Winey
 Jeffrey Winicour
 Mark Brian Wise
 John Curtis Wright
 Aihua Xie
 Weitao Yang
 James A. Yorke

2004

 Nigel Graham Adams
 Marcelo Alonso
 David Andelman
 Natan Andrei
 Dmetri V Averin
 Paul A. Avery
 Yshai Avishai
 Christina Allyssa Back
 Andrew Robert Baden
 James Edward Bailey
 Robert Allen Bartynski
 Robert John Beichner
 Gregory Benford
 Herbert Stanton Bennett
 Bernd A. Berg
 Zvi Bern
 Robert Howard Bernstein
 Nicholas P. Bigelow
 Ikaros I Bigi
 Dieter H Bimberg
 Raymond Francis Bishop
 Daniela Bortoletto
 Robert W. Bower
 Mark John Bowick
 Michael Brenner
 Joseph Warren Brill
 Collin Leslie Broholm
 J. Michael Brown
 Ramesh Chandra Budhani
 Adi Bulsara
 Matthias Burkardt
 Volker Dietmar Burkert
 J David Carlson
 John Lennart Carlsten
 Richard Roy Cavanagh
 Carlton M. Caves
 Marshall Robert Cleland
 Robert Edward Cohen
 Peter Semler Cooper
 Hans Juergen Coufal
 Harold G Craighead
 Roman Czujko
 David Jarvis Dean
 James H. Degnan
 Clarence Forbes Dewey
 Ulrike Diebold
 Malgorzata Dobrowolska
 Peter Arnold Dowben
 Rainer Andreas Dressler
 Douglas Jack Durian
 David J. Eaglesham
 Bruno Eckhardt
 Robert S. Eisenberg
 Steven Ray Elliott
 Henning Esbensen
 William E. Evenson
 Harindra Joseph Fernando
 Galen B. Fisher
 Lawrence H Ford
 George Fytas
 Paul Roesel Garabedian
 Julio Gea-Banacloche
 Robert D. Gehrz
 Graciela Beatriz Gelmini
 David Gershoni
 Bruce Gibbard
 John Dale Gillaspy
 Phillip R. Goode
 Alexander Yu Grosberg
 Godfrey Anthony Gumbs
 Hong Guo
 Alexander Lowe Harris
 Frank E. Harris
 Kenneth Charles Hass
 Jacqueline N. Hewitt
 Kenneth H. Hicks
 Peter Joseph Hirschfeld
 Stephen Holloway
 Howard Richard Huff
 Herbert E. Huppert
 Zahid Hussain
 Theodore Jacobson
 Abolhassan Jawahery
 Hantao Ji
 Robert Joynt
 Peter Jung
 Toshitaka Kajino
 Ann Renee Karagozian
 Alamgir Karim
 George Em Karniadakis
 Kenneth Franklin Kelton
 Anatoli S. Kheifets
 Robert Francis Kiefl
 Heinz-Jurgen Kluge
 Katrin Kneipp
 Mark Elwood Koepke
 V. Alan Kostelecky
 Predrag S. Krstic
 Sergey Lebedev
 Ting-Kuo Lee
 Arlene Judith Lennox
 Maciej Lewenstein
 Ralph Linsker
 Jane E.G. Lipson
 Andrea Jo-Wei Liu
 Hui Chun Liu
 Chih-Yuan Lu
 Timothy C. Luce
 Bengt I. Lundqvist
 Corinne Alison Manogue
 Marvin Lloyd Marshak
 Nicholas Leon Semple Martin
 Igor Ilich Mazin
 Roger McWilliams
 Curtis A. Meyer
 Zein-Eddine Meziani
 Anthony Mezzacappa
 James Angus Miller
 Umar Mohideen
 Mary Beth Todd Monroe
 David Scott Montgomery
 David Steven Moore
 Donald T. Morelli
 Michael David Morse
 Fredrick Iver Olness
 Kenju Otsuka
 Serge Yurievich Ovchinnikov
 Ho Jung Paik
 Jeevak Mahmud Parpia
 Robert Edwin Peterkin
 Richard W. Peterson
 Lal Ariyaratna Pinnaduwage
 Stephen S. Pinsky
 Annick Pouquet
 John C. Price
 Krishna Rajagopal
 Manijeh Razeghi
 Zhifeng Ren
 David H. Rice
 Leonid Rivkin
 Scott H. Robertson
 Thomas Dale Rognlien
 William Melvyn Roquemore
 Caroline Anne Ross
 Angel Rubio
 Czeslaw Zygmunt Rudowicz
 John Belting Rundle
 Victor Ryzhii
 Hossein Roshani Sadeghpour
 Richard T. Scalettar
 Peter Ernest Schiffer
 Beate Schmittmann
 Michael P. Schulz
 Benjamin Wade Schumacher
 Robert Edward Schwall
 John Campbell Scott
 Paul R. Selvin
 Moshe Shapiro
 Vivek Anand Sharma
 Joseph Shinar
 John Singleton
 Andrei Smolyakov
 Gregory R. Snow
 Stephen Steadman
 Andris Talis Stelbovics
 Kellogg Sheffield Stelle
 Mark David Stiles
 Joseph Paul Straley
 Michael Anthony Stroscio
 Linda Ellen Sugiyama
 Michael James Syphers
 Rongjia Tao
 Craig M. Tarver
 Michael L. Telson
 Louis J. Terminello
 Stephen T. Thornton
 David Tomanek
 Salvatore Torquato
 Michael Matthew John Treacy
 Robert Stephen Tschirhart
 Yuhai Tu
 Donald P. Umstadter
 Veronica Vaida
 Jose Luis Vicent
 Peter Willis Voorhees
 Albert Fordyce Wagner
 David Hennessey Waldeck
 Lawrence B. Weinstein
 Michael Stephen Wertheim
 Frank Wilczek
 Peter Woelfle
 Jonathan Syrkin Wurtele
 Min Xiao
 Victor Mikhailovich Yakovenko
 Perry Yaney
 Victor A. Yarba
 Jun Ye
 Nai-Chang Yeh
 Li-Hua Yu
 Horace P. Yuen
 Gary P. Zank
 Frank Zimmermann
 Stefan Zollner
 Juan J de Pablo
 Ubirajara L. van Kolck

2005

 David Albright
 Bruce Allen
 Nils Overgaard Andersen
 Charles E. Anderson
 Scott Law Anderson
 Wanda Andreoni
 Alain Jean Aspect
 Nadine N. Aubry
 Sebastien Balibar
 Supriyo Bandyopadhyay
 Dmitri N. Basov
 Christopher John Bebek
 Eshel Ben-Jacob
 Pallab Bhattacharya
 Carrol Reid Bingham
 Eric G. Blackman
 Gerald Charles Blazey
 Paul Thaddeus Bonoli
 Alexander Mikhailovich Bratkovsky
 William John Briscoe
 Alan David Bross
 Dmitry Budker
 Vasily V. Bulatov
 David G. Cahill
 Bruce E. Carlsten
 Tze-Chiang Chen
 Hai-Ping Cheng
 Yang-Tse Cheng
 Emily Shuk Chi Ching
 Wolfgang Christian
 John M. Cornwall
 Albert Crowe
 Peter T. Cummings
 Steven Thomas Cundiff
 Predrag Cvitanovic
 Eric D'Hoker
 James C Davis
 David P. DeMille
 John Anthony DeSanto
 Michael Paul Desjarlais
 Ivan H. Deutsch
 Todd Ditmire
 William D. Dorland
 David Ross Douglas
 Robert V. Duncan
 John Kelly Eaton
 James N. Eckstein
 Stephen Bernard Fahy
 Joseph Louis Feldman
 Andrew James Fisher
 Peter Karl Fritschel
 James Nathan Fry
 Alexander Luis Gaeta
 K. K. Gan
 Alejandro Garcia
 J. William Gary
 Bruce Douglas Gaulin
 Kurt E. Gibble
 Thomas Glasmacher
 Leonardo Golubovic
 Guang-Yu Guo
 Taekjip Ha
 Aksel L. Hallin
 Jeffrey S. Hangst
 Hartmut Mathes Hofmann
 Klaus Honscheid
 Jean Pierre Hulin
 Gerhard Hummer
 Martin Dominik Hurlimann
 Charles Earl Hyde-Wright
 Lin I
 Carlos A. Iglesias
 Peter Martin Jacobs
 Henri J. F. Jansen
 Tina Marie Kaarsberg
 Mark A. Kasevich
 Emmanuel H. Knill
 Olga Kocharovskaya
 Haruo Kojima
 Kurt Kremer
 Krishna Subramanian Kumar
 Brian L. LaBombard
 Daniel Perry Lathrop
 El-Hang Lee
 Jae Koo Lee
 Mark Lee
 Nancy Ellen Levinger
 Robert J. Levis
 Dongqi Li
 Hui Li
 Xinsheng Sean Ling
 Marjatta A. Lyyra
 Michael C. Mackey
 Jaroslaw Majewski
 Lute Maleki
 Jochen Mannhart
 Michael P. Marder
 Donald Marolf
 Todd J. Martinez
 Martin R Maxey
 Elizabeth F. McCormack
 Kevin S. McFarland
 Arthur Robert McGurn
 Eckart Heinz Meiburg
 Yuri B Melnichenko
 Wallace Kendal Melville
 Aldo Dante Migone
 Laszlo Mihaly
 Michael D Miller
 Udayan Mohanty
 Christopher Roy Monroe
 John Alan Moriarty
 Roman Movshovich
 Elvira Moya De Guerra
 Thomas Mullin
 Khandker Abdul Muttalib
 Satyanarayan Nandi
 Matthias Neubert
 Theodore B. Norris
 Pablo Ordejon
 Lynne Hamilton Orr
 Raymond Osborn
 Krzysztof Pachucki
 Stephen John Pearton
 Timothy John Pedley
 William Anthony Peebles
 Francois M. Peeters
 Unil A. G. Perera
 Cynthia Kieras Phillips
 Jorge Piekarewicz
 William C. Priedhorsky
 Vladimir Privman
 Jianwai Qiu
 Harry Brian Radousky
 Daniel Charles Ralph
 Jayendran Cumaraswamy Rasaiah
 Laura Reina
 R. Riazuddin
 Jorge Juan Rocca
 Warren F. Rogers
 John Ruhl
 James Patrick Runt
 Gregory Charles Rutledge
 William R. Salaneck
 Maria M. Santore
 John Louis Sarrao
 Wayne Mark Saslow
 Levi Schachter
 Thomas M. Schaefer
 Steven J. Schiff
 Tamar Schlick
 Robert J. Schoelkopf
 Joel Nathan Schulman
 Steve Semancik
 Yannis Kyriakos Semertzidis
 Stephen A. Sheffield
 Qun Shen
 Janine Shertzer
 Eric Lawrence Shirley
 Qimiao Si
 Theo Siegrist
 Steven H. Simon
 John (Jack) Peter Simons
 Rajiv R. P. Singh
 Constantine (Gus) Sinnis
 James Gilbert Smith
 Glenn D. Starkman
 James Henry Stathis
 Gennady V. Stupakov
 Igal Szleifer
 Sami G. Tantawi
 Michael Thoennessen
 James Hayden Thomas
 Nancy L. Thompson
 Eite Tiesinga
 Walter Toki
 Jean-Marc Triscone
 Sandra Marina Troian
 Allan J. Tylka
 Cyrus Jehangir Umrigar
 Alexander L. Velikovich
 Michele Viviani
 Vitalii K. Vlasko-Vlasov
 Joannes Theodorus Maria Walraven
 Harry Robert James Walters
 Jian-Sheng Wang
 Zhong Lin Wang
 Hiroshi Watanabe
 Renata Maria M. Wentzcovitch
 Joe Wong
 Sotiris S. Xantheas
 Mohsen S. Yeganeh
 Sherry J. Yennello
 Clare C. Yu
 Lu Yu
 Stephane Zaleski
 Xiao Cheng Zeng
 Shoucheng Zhang
 Shufeng Zhang
 Alexander Zholents
 Fulvio Zonca
 Muhammad Suhail Zubairy

2006

 Philip Wayne Adams
 Louis John Allamandola
 Peter Andrew Amendt
 Susan Theresa Arnold
 David Attwood
 Ilya Averbukh
 Sivaramakrishnan Balachandar
 Sanjay Kumar Banerjee
 Stefano Baroni
 Ghassan Batrouni
 Daniel Bauer
 Ulrich J. Becker
 Donald H. Bilderback
 Simon John Laird Billinge
 Estela Olga Blaisten-Barojas
 Edward Charles Blucher
 Girsh Blumberg
 Georg Bollen
 Roger T. Bonnecaze
 Garry L. Brown
 Garnett W. Bryant
 Aurel Bulgac
 Timothy Bunning
 Theodore W. Burkhardt
 Hui Cao
 Hilda A. Cerdeira
 Shirley Suiling Chan
 Choong-Seock Chang
 Manoj K. Chaudhury
 Kwong-sang Cheng
 Siu Ah Chin
 Sung Nee George Chu
 William Arthur Coles
 Gilbert Wilson Collins
 Thomas C. Corke
 Lance Eric De Long
 Michael W. Deem
 Cees Dekker
 Bernard T. Delley
 Alexander A. Demkov
 Brenda Lynn Dingus
 Andrey V. Dobrynin
 Philip M. Duxbury
 Glenn S. Edwards
 Daniel S. Elliot
 Steven Charles Erwin
 Brett Daniel Esry
 John R. Ferron
 Peter H. Fisher
 Michael R. Fitzsimmons
 James Knox Freericks
 Guo-yong Fu
 Richard Maurice Fye
 Charles Forbes Gammie
 Francisco Javier Garcia De Abajo
 Ricardo Garcia Garcia
 Peter Motz Gehring
 Gabriele F. Giuliani
 James Alexander Glazier
 Sharon C. Glotzer
 George Thompson Gray
 Roderick George Greaves
 Keith A. Griffioen
 Timothy J. Hallman
 Paula T. Hammond
 George Friedrich Hanne
 Neil Harrison
 Gregory A. Hebner
 Kristian P. Helmerson
 E. Susana Hernandez
 Antonio Hernando
 Hans Jurgen Herrmann
 Kristiaan Ludwig Guido Heyde
 Mark Hillery
 Ian Hinchliffe
 Robert S. Hixson
 Mark J. Hogan
 Philip John Holmes
 Norbert Richard Holtkamp
 Calvin R. Howell
 Qing Hu
 Steven David Hudson
 Gerald P. Huffman
 Ulrich Höfer
 Massimo Inguscio
 Lev B. Ioffe
 Elizabeth Jenkins
 Sabre Kais
 Charles Lewis Kane
 Chi-Chang Kao
 Shashi P. Karna
 Andrew David Kent
 David Alan Kessler
 Dmitri E. Kharzeev
 Yuri S. Kivshar
 Stephen Jacob Klippenstein
 Yury G. Kolomensky
 Martin Harvey Krieger
 Philipp Paul Kronberg
 Chung King Law
 Jonathan Mac Lawrence
 Dietrich Leibfried
 Robert G. Leigh
 Chikang Li
 Jechiel Lichtenstadt
 Zhihong Lin
 Ying Liu
 Zheng-Tian Lu
 Alexander Henderson Lumpkin
 Jacques Magnaudet
 David G. Mandrus
 John Frederick Marko
 Richard Martel
 Jose Luis Martins
 Francoise Masnou-Seeuws
 Howard S. Matis
 Bernard Judah Matkowsky
 Wolodymyr Melnitchouk
 Nikolitsa Merminga
 Gerard J. Milburn
 John Gordon Milton
 William Michael Morse
 Mark G. Mungal
 Norman William Murray
 Sergei Nagaitsev
 Sultana Nurun Nahar
 Michael Anthony Nastasi
 Nathan Newman
 David J. Norris
 David Paul Norton
 Bradford G. Orr
 Peter N. Ostroumov
 William R. Ott
 Ronald L. Panton
 Piero Antonio Pianetta
 Alexander J. Piel
 Michael Plischke
 Dinko Pocanic
 Nikolai V. Prokof'ev
 Dale Ian Pullin
 Frederick J. Raab
 David C. Radford
 Mikhail E. Raikh
 Georg A. Raithel
 Andrew Marshall Rappe
 Frederic A. Rasio
 David H. Reitze
 Raffaele Resta
 Stephen Reucroft
 John Edward Rice
 Steven M. Ritz
 John A. Rogers
 Eli Ira Rosenberg
 Anders Rosengren
 Bradley J. Roth
 Daniel Rugar
 Barry C. Sanders
 Ina Sarcevic
 John Stephen Sarff
 Sutanu Sarkar
 Daniel Wolf Savin
 Lawrence B. Schein
 Jorg Schmalian
 Ulrich Joseph Schollwoeck
 Herwig Schopper
 Steven David Schwartz
 John F. Seely
 Mats Anton Selen
 Balajapalli S. Shastry
 Paul Sheldon
 David W. Snoke
 Dam Thanh Son
 William J. Spalding
 Michael Springborg
 Mohan Srinivasarao
 Jolanta Irene Stankiewicz
 Gustavo A. Stolovitzky
 Hendricus T.C. Stoof
 Martin Stutzmann
 Arthur G. Suits
 Frank Szmulowicz
 Kwong-Tin Tang
 Kenneth Thomas Andrew Taylor
 Eddy M. Timmermans
 Gregory Louis Timp
 John Toner
 Jennie Harriet Traschen
 Rick Peter Trebino
 Manyee Betty Tsang
 Tamas Vicsek
 Gianfranco Vidali
 David M. Villeneuve
 Thomas Vogt
 Arthur F. Voter
 Wladyslaw Walukiewicz
 Enge Wang
 Hailin Wang
 Lin-Wang Wang
 Kerry Lewis Whisnant
 Dennis Gordon Whyte
 Scott Willenbrock
 David Robert Williams
 James Stanislaus Williams
 Michael Grae Worster
 Gang Xiao
 Xueming Yang
 John Martin Yelton
 Pui-Kuen Yeung
 Thad P. Zaleskiewicz
 Yimei Zhu
 Royce K.P. Zia
 Theo J.M. Zouros

2007

 Bruce Ackerson
 Herzl Aharoni
 Henri Alloul
 Dan Amidei
 Lynden Archer
 Marina Artuso
 Andrew Bandrauk
 Gang Bao
 Harold Baranger
 Alexis Baratoff
 Amy Barger
 Klaus Bohnen
 Massimo Boninsegni
 Michael Borland
 Elliott R. Brown
 Gail Brown
 John Budai
 Kieron Burke
 David Burrows
 Tucker Carrington
 Peter Celliers
 Massimo Cerdonio
 Britton Chance
 Shih-Lin Chang
 Michael Chapman
 Dante Chialvo
 Leonardo Civale
 Nigel Clarke
 John C. Collins
 Lance R. Collins
 Paul Corkum
 Robin Cote
 Robert Crease
 Vincent Crespi
 Mark Croft
 Michael Crommie
 Michael Cuneo
 Bogdan Dabrowski
 Dipankar Das Sarma
 James DeYoreo
 Roger Dixon
 Aristide Dogariu
 Michel Dupuis
 John Dutcher
 C.W. Francis Everitt
 Gregory Ezra
 Mikhail Feigelman
 Jonathan Feng
 Paul Fenter
 Wolfram Fischer
 Eanna Flanagan
 Michael Flatté
 Geoffrey Forden
 Rodney Fox
 Leonid Frankfurt
 Miguel Furman
 Haiyan Gao
 Peter Garnavich
 S Gary
 Jan Genzer
 Neil Gershenfeld
 Michael Gershenson
 Russell Giannetta
 George Gillies
 Sharath Girimaji
 Peyman Givi
 Mark Glauser
 Ari Glezer
 Robert Golub
 Valeri Goncharov
 Gabriela Gonzalez
 Xavier Gonze
 A. Gover
 Giorgio Gratta
 Stephen Gray
 Martin Greven
 Rudolf Grimm
 Marilyn Gunner
 Carol K. Hall
 Joseph Haus
 Paula Heron
 Ady Hershcovitch
 Joanne Hewett
 Denise Hinkel
 Morten Hjorth-Jensen
 James Hollenhorst
 Christopher Homes
 Don Howard
 Emlyn Hughes
 Jeffrey Hunt
 Joey Huston
 Yves Idzerda
 Jisoon Ihm
 Kent Irwin
 Charles Jaffe
 Mark Jarrell
 William Jeffrey
 Poul Jessen
 David Jonas
 Kevin Jones
 Igor Kaganovich
 Rajiv Kalia
 Mehran Kardar
 Alain Karma
 Safa Kasap
 Howard Katz
 Edward Kearns
 Steven Kettell
 Shiv Khanna
 Philip Kim
 Yoshifumi Kimura
 Edward Kinney
 David Kirkby
 Paul Kleiber
 Lev Kofman
 Robert Krasny
 Karl Krushelnick
 Sebastian Kuhn
 Christian Kurtsiefer
 Kris Kwiatkowski
 Albert Lazzarini
 Jennifer Lewis
 Daniel Lidar
 Yu Lin
 Seth Lloyd
 Lyle Long
 Ellen Longmire
 Jorge Lopez
 Marshall Luban
 Jianpeng Ma
 Augusto Macchiavelli
 Chris Macosko
 Albert Macrander
 Sadamichi Maekawa
 Richard Majeski
 Sara Majetich
 Protik Majumder
 Arjun Makhijani
 F Bary Malik
 Luz Martinez-Miranda
 Thomas E. Mason
 Anne McCoy
 Stephen McKeever
 Gareth McKinley
 Tom McLeish
 Anita Mehta
 Alan Migdall
 Richard Milner
 Rodolfo Miranda
 Noemi Mirkin
 Noor Mohammad
 Victor V. Moshchalkov
 Meenakshi Narain
 Mark Newman
 Thomas Nordlund
 Edward O'Brien
 Jurg Osterwalder
 Clinton Petty
 Richard Phillips
 Eugene Polzik
 Vladimir Prigodin
 Thomas Prince
 Mohit Randeria
 Jean-Marcel Rax
 Lucia Reining
 Edward Rezayi
 Robert Rimmer
 Winston Roberts
 Jan Rost
 Krzysztof Rykaczewski
 Van Saarloos
 Anders Sandvik
 Dipankar Das Sarma
 Hendrik Schatz
 van Schilfgaarde
 Michael Schmidt
 Reinhardt Schuhmann
 Peter Searson
 Edmund Seebauer
 Edward Seidel
 Roseanne Sension
 Donald Shapero
 Michael Shelley
 Chih-Kang Shih
 Pushpendra Singh
 Lee Smolin
 Alexei Sokolov
 Paul Sommers
 Nicola Spaldin
 Harold Spinka
 S Sridhar
 Henrik Stapelfeldt
 Giovanni Stefani
 Thomas Stoehlker
 Matthew Strassler
 Stephen Streiffer
 Svetlana Sukhishvili
 Jonathan Sun
 Attila Szabo
 Raza Tahir-Kheli
 Stavros Tavoularis
 Barbara Terhal
 John Terning
 James Terry
 Naresh Thadhani
 Alan Todd
 DeJan Trbojevic
 Michel Trudeau
 Din Ping Tsai
 John Turneaure
 Sergio Ulloa
 Patrick Vaccaro
 Raju Venugopalan
 Boudewyn Verhaar
 Yurii Vlasov
 Dimitri Vvedensky
 François Waelbroeck
 Lijun Wang
 David Weiss
 Robert Westervelt
 J. Craig Wheeler
 William Wisniewski
 Henryk Witala
 Xiaoxing Xi
 Yoshihisa Yamamoto
 Li You
 Sufi Zafar
 Leonid Zakharov
 Eli Zeldov
 Xiangdong Zhu
 Annette Zippelius
 Max Zolotorev
 Raffaele Mezzenga

2008

 Daniel Akerib
 Muhammad Alam
 Robert C. Albers
 Igor Aleiner
 Alexandre Alexandrov
 Andre Anders
 Spiro Antiochos
 Dimitri Argyriou
 Laszlo Baksay
 Kenneth Baldwin
 Dwight Barkley
 Osman A. Basaran
 Herman Batelaan
 Ulrich Baur
 Gregory Beaucage
 John Belcher
 Fabio Beltram
 Eli Ben-Naim
 Samuel Benz
 Michael Berman
 Luca Biferale
 Klaus Blaum
 Stephan Bless
 Michael R Brown
 Michael Brunger
 Rafael Bruschweiler
 Philip Burrows
 Robert Caldwell
 Steven Carlip
 Peggy Cebe
 Bulbul Chakraborty
 Claudio Chamon
 Venkat Chandrasekhar
 Zenghu Chang
 Jian-Ping Chen
 Long-Qing Chen
 Ori Cheshnovsky
 William S. Childress
 Wai-Yim Ching
 Paul K. Chu
 James V. Coe
 John S. Conway
 Alan Costley
 Aldo Covello
 Christine Coverdale
 Paul Crowell
 Jens Dahl
 Pengcheng Dai
 Pawel Danielewicz
 M. Jamal Deen
 Andrei Derevianko
 Thomas Devereaux
 Scott Diddams
 Julian A. Domaradzki
 Jonathan P. Dowling
 Mark D. Doyle
 Ron Elber
 Nader Engheta
 Shanhui Fan
 Ambrogio Fasoli
 Cary Forest
 Gabor Forgacs
 James A. Forrest
 Stephen Forrest
 John Fox
 Eric D Fredrickson
 Chris Fryer
 Chong Long Fu
 David Garfinkle
 Theo Geisel
 Stefan A. Goedeceker
 Bennett Goldberg
 Eugene Golowich
 Maury C. Goodman
 Amit Goyal
 Élisabeth Guazzelli
 Alexander V. Gurevich
 William S. Hammack
 Ulrich H. Hansmann
 Richard Harris
 Anna Hasenfratz
 Dennis Hayes
 Ann Heinson
 Robert Hengehold
 Charles J. Horowitz
 John P. Hughes
 Terence Hwa
 Robert Hwang
 Takashi Imai
 Ravinder K. Jain
 O'Dean Judd
 Kazhikathra Kailasanath
 Vassiliki Kalogera
 Marc P. Kamionkowski
 Peter Kammel
 Daniel Kennefick
 Peter Kes
 Daniel Khomskii
 Peter Kneisel
 Ryosuke Kodama
 Jun Kondo
 Jacobo Konigsberg
 Manoochehr M. Koochesfahani
 Ashutosh Kotwal
 Georg Krausch
 Sergey Kravchenko
 Frank Krennrich
 Ramanan Krishnamoorti
 I. Joseph Kroll
 Alexander Kusenko
 George Kyrala
 Pablo Laguna
 Alessandra Lanzara
 Qi Li
 John Lister
 Thomas W. Ludlam
 Richard M. Lueptow
 Graeme Luke
 Alenka Luzar
 Andy Mackinnon
 Mujeeb R. Malik
 Victor Malka
 Seth R. Marder
 John Markert
 Thomas G. Mason
 Mark W. Matsen
 Konstantin Matveev
 Stephen C. McGuire
 Carmen Menoni
 Curtis Menyuk
 Kathryn Moler
 Klaus Molmer
 Sekazi Mtingwa
 Patric Muggli
 Amy Mullin
 Larry A. Nagahara
 Chang H. Nam
 Paul Nealey
 Dan A. Neumann
 Harvey B. Newman
 Jeffrey S. Nico
 Tae Won Noh
 Yasar Onel
 Paolo Orlandi
 Hans Othmer
 Peter Palffy-Muhoray
 Giulia Pancheri-Srivastava
 Vijay Pande
 Scott E Parker
 John Parsons
 Brooks H. Pate
 Udo Pernisz
 Amanda Petford-Long
 Gerassimos Petratos
 Daniel Phillips
 Simon R. Phillpot
 Piotr Piecuch
 Michael Plesniak
 Marek Ploszajczak
 Eric Poisson
 James V. Porto
 Oleg Prezhdo
 Yongzhong Qian
 Apparao M. Rao
 Triveni Rao
 Sanjay K. Reddy
 Fan Ren
 Norna Robertson
 Eli Rotenberg
 Ira Z. Rothstein
 James Ryan
 Mark Saffman
 Lars Samuelson
 Jacobo Santamaria
 Peter Schmelcher
 Annabella Selloni
 Surajit Sen
 Andrei Seryi
 Allen Sessoms
 Mark Sherwin
 Vladimir D. Shiltsev
 Sung-Chul Shin
 Shalom Shlomo
 Gennady Shvets
 David Siddons
 Rex Skodje
 Leslie M. Smith
 Per Soderlind
 Glenn S. Solomon
 Shivaji Sondhi
 Soren Sorensen
 Richard Spontak
 Kyle Squires
 Aephraim Steinberg
 Richard Steiner
 Albert Stolow
 Michael Stone
 Bela Sulik
 Boris Svistunov
 Samuel Tabor
 Geoffrey Thornton
 Evgeny Tsymbal
 Joachim Ullrich
 Charles Vane
 Alessandro Vespignani
 Werner Vogelsang
 Sergei Voloshin
 Carlos Wagner
 Simon Watkins
 R. Bruce Weisman
 Chris I. Westbrook
 David Whelan
 Dean Wilkening
 Clayton Williams
 Alec M. Wodtke
 Sunney Xie
 Xincheng Xie
 Victor Yakhot
 Gong Yeh
 Taner Yildirim
 Jan Zaanen
 Joseph A. Zasadzinski
 Oleg Zatsarinny
 Xiang Zhang
 Andrey Zheludev
 Lucy M. Ziurys
 Michael E. Zucker

2009

 Cammy R. Abernathy
 Vladimir M. Agranovich
 Doyeol Ahn
 Reka Z. Albert
 James G. Alessi
 Rolf Allenspach
 Farhad Ardalan
 Reza Arghavani
 Roger E.A. Arndt
 Raymond C. Ashoori
 Richard A. Baartman
 Kaladi S. Babu
 Carlo F. Barenghi
 John L. Bechhoefer
 Farhat N. Beg
 David J. Benson
 Janos Bergou
 Sergey M. Bezrukov
 Rana Biswas
 Zlatko Blacic
 Charles T. Black
 Roger Blandford
 John M. Blondin
 Tomas Bohr
 Eric Borguet
 David K. Bradley
 William N. Brandt
 James G. Brasseur
 Sergey Budko
 John W.M. Bush
 Franco Cacialli
 Laurence S. Cain
 Manuela Campanelli
 Jeff Candy
 Gang Cao
 John Carlstrom
 G. Lawrence Carr
 Steven L. Ceccio
 Ruth W. Chabay
 Mark B. Chadwick
 Ching-Ray Chang
 Keejoo Chang
 Jeffrey R. Childress
 Matthew F. Chisholm
 Andrew N. Cleland
 Lynn Cominsky
 Donald G. Crabb
 Jeffrey D. Crouch
 Karsten V. Danzmann
 Hans W. Diehl
 Milind Diwan
 Robert R. Doering
 Luming Duan
 James W. Dufty
 Jens G. Eggers
 Sarah C. Eno
 Klaus Ensslin
 Todd Evans
 Bradley Filippone
 Katherine Freese
 Laurence E. Fried
 Mamoru Fujiwara
 Bo Gao
 Andrea M.V. Garofalo
 Yuval Gefen
 Thomas R. Gentile
 Joseph A. Giaime
 Xingao Gong
 Stephen Gourlay
 David J. Griffiths
 Carl J. Gross
 Supratik Guha
 Jens H. Gundlach
 Gernot Guntherodt
 Gaston R. Gutierrez
 Maciej S. Gutowski
 Richard F. Haglund
 Gregory E. Hall
 Scott T. Hannahs
 Siegfried S. Hecker
 Alexander Heger
 Beate Heinemann
 Ulrich Heintz
 Kerry W. Hipps
 Theodore W. Hodapp
 Craig J. Hogan
 Umran Inan
 Kevin Ingersent
 Van Isacker
 Christopher Jarzynski
 Raymond Jeanloz
 Kevin L. Jensen
 Quanxi Jia
 Samuel J. Jiang
 Albrecht Karle
 Ram S. Katiyar
 Joseph Katz
 Robert M. Kerr
 J.O. Kessler
 Bamin Khomami
 Jin K. Kim
 Spencer Klein
 Junichiro Kono
 Kannan M. Krishnan
 Alexander M. Kuzmich
 Jueinai Kwo
 Greg L. Landsberg
 Robert E. Laxdal
 Ka Yee C. Lee
 Stanislas Leibler
 Jeremy Levy
 Eric Lin
 James T. Linnemann
 Paolo Luchini
 Michael Luke
 Chung-Pei M. Ma
 Rajesh Maingi
 Charles M. Marcus
 David C. Martin
 Dmitri Maslov
 Patricia L. McBride
 Gail C. McLaughlin
 Robert D. McMichael
 Mark W. Meisel
 Ulf G. Meissner
 Narayanan Menon
 Gerhard Meyer
 Peter F. Michelson
 Dennis M. Mills
 Rory A. Miskimen
 Laurens W. Molenkamp
 Arthur Molvik
 Teresa Montaruli
 David C. Morse
 Juan G. Muga
 Michael S. Murillo
 Ganpathy N. Murthy
 Balakrishnan Naduvalath
 Aiichiro Nakano
 Rajamani Narayanan
 Thomas Nattermann
 Raffi M. Nazikian
 Kenji Ohmori
 Roberto Onofrio
 Carlos R. Ordonez
 Christine A. Orme
 Pal Ormos
 Shelley A. Page
 Ci-Ling Pan
 Yung Woo Park
 David S. Perry
 Joseph W. Perry
 Rob Phillips
 Kok-Khoo Phua
 Robert K. Plunkett
 David F. Plusquellic
 Jianming Qian
 Stephen R. Quake
 Eliot J. Quataert
 Yuri Ralchenko
 John C. Raymond
 Bruce C. Reed
 Francoise Remacle
 John K. Riles
 Mo Samimy
 Brian L. Sawford
 Gregory K. Schenter
 Alan Jay Schwartz
 Nathan Seiberg
 Xiaowen Shan
 Dan Shapira
 Sergey Sheyko
 Luis O. Silva
 Gary W. Slater
 Andrei N. Slavin
 Kevin E. Smith
 Lee G. Sobotka
 Yiqiao Song
 Fotis Sotiropoulos
 Carl R. Sovinec
 James S. Speck
 Donald W.L. Sprung
 John W. Staples
 Mark J. Stevens
 Gay B. Stewart
 Rhonda M. Stroud
 Peter W. Talkner
 Tomasz R. Taylor
 Pappannan Thiyagarajan
 E. Terry Tomboulis
 Steven P. Trainoff
 Jüergen Troe
 Vladimir V. Tsuknuk
 Thomas Ullrich
 Joka M. Vandenberg
 Usha Varshney
 Matt Visser
 Konstantin L. Vodopyanov
 Juwen Wang
 Michelle D. Wang
 Timothy Wei
 Hanno H. Weitering
 Catherine L. Westfall
 Nicholas E. White
 George M. Whitesides
 Scott Wilks
 Brian L. Winer
 Bogdan B. Wojtsekhowski
 Richard Wolfson
 Darien R. Wood
 Yue Wu
 Nu Xu
 Dmitri Yakovlev
 Ali Yazdani
 Anvar Zakhidov
 Jorg Zegenhagen
 Jin Z. Zhang
 Shiwei Zhang
 Dongping Zhong
 Wojciech H. Zurek

2010

 Harald Ade
 Musahid Ahmed
 Charles Ahn
 Triantaphyllos Akylas
 Muhammad Arif
 Mark Asta
 Stefano Atzeni
 Van Baak
 Olgica Bakajin
 Ian Balitsky
 Anthony Baltz
 Gerrit E. Bauer
 Paulo Bedaque
 Dietrich Belitz
 Laurent Bellaiche
 David Bennett
 Flemming Besenbacher
 Pushpalatha Bhat
 Michael Blaskiewicz
 Doerte Blume
 Patrick Brady
 Kenny Breuer
 Mark Brongersma
 J. David Brown
 David Bruhwiler
 Carl Brune
 Marco Buongiorno-Nardelli
 Sean Carroll
 Cynthia Cattell
 Taihyun Chang
 Kookheon Char
 Jeremy Chittenden
 Haecheon Choi
 David Christen
 Isaac Chuang
 Brian Cole
 Timothy Colonius
 Genevieve Comte-Bellot
 Scott Crooker
 Vikram Dalal
 Liem Dang
 Arati Dasgupta
 William Daughton
 Michael Day
 Dmitri Denisov
 Ali Dhinojwala
 Gerald Diebold
 Keith Dienes
 Hong Ding
 Weixing Ding
 Vladimir Dobrosavljevic
 Valeriy Dolmatov
 Vinayak Dravid
 Tevian Dray
 Jan Egedal
 Jon Eggert
 Latifa Elouadrhiri
 Jonathan Engel
 Lloyd Engel
 Henry Everitt
 Li-Zhi Fang
 Kristen Fichthorn
 Victor Flambaum
 James Franson
 Michael Fuhrer
 James Fuller
 Tom Furtak
 Wei Gai
 Richard Gaitskell
 David Geohegan
 Cecilia Gerber
 Pupa Gilbert
 Steven Greenbaum
 Niels Gronbech-Jensen
 Francois Gygi
 Stanley Haan
 Carl Hagen
 Hans Hammer
 Sharon Hammes-Schiffer
 James Hannon
 H. Hentschel
 Burkard Hillebrands
 Richard Hughes
 Plamen Ch. Ivanov
 Bahram Jalali
 Michel Janssen
 Julius Jellinek
 Bogumil Jeziorski
 Hongxing Jiang
 Rongying Jin
 Hiroshi Jinnai
 David Kaiser
 John Kasianowicz
 Maki Kawai
 T. A. Kennedy
 Stephen Kent
 Thomas Kephart
 Ching-Hwa Kiang
 David Kieda
 Alejandro Kievsky
 Thomas Killian
 DaiSik Kim
 Greg Kimmel
 William Klein
 Leonhard Kleiser
 Randall Knize
 Arshad Kudrolli
 Vasudevan Lakshminarayanan
 Seung Lee
 Luis Lehner
 Amy Liu
 Wolfgang Lorenzon
 Mikhail Lukin
 Li-Shi Luo
 En Ma
 Ivan Marusic
 Bruce Mason
 John Mateja
 Nergis Mavalvala
 David McClelland
 David McComas
 Robert McQueeney
 Jonathan Menard
 Jose Mestre
 Marc Meyers
 A. Alan Middleton
 Katsumi Midorikawa
 Lubos Mitas
 Joseph Mohr
 David Morrissey
 Igor Moskalenko
 Christopher Mudry
 Priyamvada Natarajan
 Keith Nugent
 Yuko Okamoto
 Peter Olmsted
 Samuel Paolucci
 Hye-Sook Park
 Peter Pesic
 Zoran Petrović
 Hong Qiang
 Zi Q. Qiu
 Yevgeny Raitses
 Devulapalli Rao
 Jeffrey Reimer
 Mary Hall Reno
 Peter Rez
 Michael Rijssnbeek
 Barrett Rogers
 Richard Rowberg
 Andrei Ruckenstein
 Petra Rudolf
 Steven Sabbagh
 Scott Sandford
 Juan Santiago
 Misak Sargsian
 Stephen Schnetzer
 Lutz Schweikhard
 Jacek Sekutowicz
 Sudip Sen
 Eun-Suk Seo
 Paul Shapiro
 Krishna Shenai
 Charles Sherrill
 Anchang Shi
 Thomas Silva
 Sindee Simon
 Peter Simpkins
 Rajiv Singh
 Jairo Sinova
 Sivalingam Sivananthan
 Ralph Skomski
 Philip Snyder
 Ratnasingham Sooryakumar
 Davison Soper
 Steven Spangler
 Geoffrey Spedding
 George Srajer
 Albert Stebbins
 Kathleen Stebe
 Mark Stockman
 Giancarlo Strinati
 Gregory Sullivan
 Benjamin Svetitsky
 Eric Swanson
 Craig Taatjes
 Hidenori Takagi
 Ichiro Takeuchi
 Jau Tang
 Lei-Han Tang
 NJ Tao
 Penger Tong
 William Trischuk
 Matthias Troyer
 George Tynan
 Neil deGrasse Tyson
 Thomas Udem
 Richard Vaia
 Carolyne Van Vliet
 John Vassilicos
 Peter Vekilov
 Emmanuel Villermaux
 Ramona Vogt
 Igor Vurgaftman
 Mickey Wade
 Fuqiang Wang
 Jin Wang
 Jin Wang
 Xun-Li Wang
 William Weber
 Matthias Weidemuller
 Andrew White
 Gary White
 Martin White
 Denis Wirtz
 Frank Wise
 Christopher Wolverton
 Lawrence Woolf
 Yong-Shi Wu
 Keqing Xia
 Jingming Xu
 Zhangbu Xu
 Yasunori Yamazaki
 Rikutaro Yoshida
 Farhad Yusef-Zadeh
 Cosmas Zachos
 Khairul B. M. Zaman
 Martin Zanni
 John Zasadzinski
 Huan-Xiang Zhou
 George O. Zimmerman
 Andrew Zwicker
 Steven van Enk

See also
 List of American Physical Society Fellows (1921–1971)
 List of American Physical Society Fellows (1972–1997)
 List of American Physical Society Fellows (2011–)

References 

1998